Dipendranath Bandyopadhyay (1936–1979) was a Bengali writer, editor, correspondent and political activist. He reshaped Bengali prose writing in late 1950 to 1970, with his deft portrayal of love, protest and anger in post-independence Bengali milieu. Associated with left political activities as student, active member of the Bengal Provincial Student Federation (BPSF), the provincial branch of All India Students Federation (AISF) Dipendratnath was a narrator of the turbulent socio-political vortex of his time. He wrote 51 short stories, 5 novels - including one unfinished - and significant number of reportage or newspaper articles, during his short-lived creative period. Specially his reportages were popular in Bengali readers. Increased political and organisational activity reduced his literary activity which decreased to a trickle in his twilight years.

Bandyopadhyay was posthumously awarded a Friends of Liberation War Honour, the third-highest state award given by the government of Bangladesh for foreigners or non-nationals.

Editing 

He was an editor of the Bengali periodical - Porichoy - for a brief period. The first issue of Porichoy was published in 1931. From 1931 to 1936 Porichoy was a quarterly. From 1936 onwards Porichoy became a monthly. Rabindranath Tagore wrote a letter of appreciation to the editor which was printed in the second issue of Porichoy. The liberal Sudhindranath Dutta allowed the control of Porichoy to pass on to 'Anti Fascist Writers Association' in 1944. The editorial policy took a radical left shift with increased control of card holders and  sympathizers of Communist Party of India. However, Porichoy always acknowledged its intellectual debt to Sudhindranath Dutta and even as late as 2001 there was a special issue to commemorate the poet's birth centenary.

Novels 

 Agami, First Part: Majhi, Kartik 1358, November 1951
 Tritiyo Bhuban, Ashwin 1364, October 1957-Published in the periodical 'Notun Sahityo' in 1364. First book edition came out in 1365 from Mitralay
 Ishwarer Sahit Sanglap (Unfinished), Agrahayana -Poush 1367, January 1960
 Gagan Thakurer Siri, Poush 1367- Chaitra-1368, Published in the periodical Bingsha Shatabdi
 Bibahobarshiki, Ashwin 1384, October 1977, Published in Kalantar

Stories 

 Shokmichil
 Ashwamedher Ghora
 Hoya Na Hoya

Reportage 
 Amar Desher Manush
 Durer Maya
 Ami India
 Ful Fotar Golpo
 Na, Voy Koribo Na
 Michiler Shankho Dhwoni Jelkhanay Prodeep Jwalabe
 No Pasaron
 Sordar
 Procchnno Swadesh
 Urao Re Urddhe Lal Nishan
 Arjun Arjun Aaj Lokkho Lokkho Jono Gono Mon
 Aaj Onyodin
 Soyuj
 Ei Bharatborsho
 Matite Ek Ritu
 Podochinho, Saptahik Kalantar, 23 December 1967
 Ghorewalababu, Saptahik Kalantar, 9,16,23 March, 13,20, 27 April 1968
 Nachiketar Desh, Dainik Kalantar, 31 January 1968
 Muiktr Path, Porichoy, December 1961
 Ekti Bitorkomulak Lathichalona, Dainik Kalantar, 31 October 1968

References 

 Chakraborty, Anischyay Ed. Riportage - Dipendranath Bandyopadhyay, Published by Ekush Shatak, January 2006
 Chakraborty, Anischyay Ed. Uponyas - Dipendranath Bandyopadhyay, Published by Ekush Shatak, January 2006
 Chakraborty, Anischyay Ed. Galpo Samogra - Dipendranath Bandyopadhyay, Published by Ekush Shatak, January 2005
 Afif Fuad, Ed. Diba Ratrir Kabya - Dipendranath Bandyopadhyay Sonkhya, July-Sept / Oct-Dec '97

External links 
  Sanhati Porichoy Archive

Bengali-language literature
1936 births
1979 deaths
People from Dhaka
Scottish Church College alumni
University of Calcutta alumni
 Writers from Kolkata
 Writers from Dhaka